This is a list of golfers who have won three times in a Korn Ferry Tour season since 1997, when a policy was enacted to promote such players immediately to the PGA Tour. The "number of events" column refers to the number of Korn Ferry Tour events it took the golfer to reach three wins.

*Includes earnings from one or more PGA Tour events played before promotion.

See also
List of golfers with most Korn Ferry Tour wins

References

Korn Ferry Tour
PGA Tour
Korn Ferry Tour, three-win